Dobbins Creek may refer to:
Dobbins Creek (California), tributary of the Yuba River
Dobbins Creek, a neighborhood community in Phoenix, Arizona
Dobbins Creek, a creek that flows through East Side Lake in Austin, Minnesota, U.S.A.